Pipe Island Light is a privately owned lighthouse on Pipe Island in St. Mary's River, Michigan. It was lit in 1888 by the Lake Carriers Association to help ships entering St. Mary's River from Lake Huron. In 2005 three cottages and the Victorian keeper's dwelling were made available for overnight stays.

Notes

References

External links
Image

Lighthouses completed in 1888
Lighthouses in Chippewa County, Michigan